The Chieftains 4 is an album by The Chieftains. It is the first album to feature Derek Bell on the harp. This album is where The Chieftains' modern sound began.

Track listing 
All tracks traditional compositions; except where indicated
 "Drowsy Maggie" – 4:00
 "Morgan Magan" – 2:53
 "The Tip of the Whistle" – 2:57
 "Bucks of Oranmore" – 2:17
 "The Battle of Aughrim" – 7:36
 "The Morning Dew" (Paddy Moloney) – 3:34
 "Carrickfergus (or Do Bhi Bean Uasal)" – 2:49
 "Sláinte Bhreagh Hiulit (Hewlett)" – 2:34
 "Cherish The Ladies" – 2:29
 "Lord Mayo" – 2:44
 "Mná na hÉireann (Women of Ireland)" (Seán Ó Riada) – 3:33
 "O'Keefe's Slide /An Suisin Ban (The white blanket) / The Star Above The Garter / The Weaver's Slide" – 3:39

Personnel 
The Chieftains
 Paddy Moloney - uillean pipes, tin whistle, arrangements, musical director
 Martin Fay - fiddle, bones
 Seán Potts - tin whistle
 Seán Keane - fiddle
 Peadar Mercier - bodhran, bones
 Derek Bell - harp
 Michael Tubridy - flute, concertina, tin whistle
Technical
Paul Tregurtha - recording
Edward Delaney - cover painting

Legacy 
The arrival of Derek Bell on harp gave The Chieftains a distinctive delicate sound. The slow air "Mná na hÉireann" (Women of Ireland), composed by Seán Ó Riada, was used in Stanley Kubrick's 1975 film Barry Lyndon. In 1996 Mike Oldfield recorded it on his album Voyager but credited it to "Traditional".

References

External links 
 
 A more complete and correct track listing at irishtune.info

The Chieftains albums
1973 albums
Claddagh Records albums
Albums recorded at Morgan Sound Studios